30 unohtumatonta laulua is a second compilation album by a Finnish singer-songwriter Aki Sirkesalo. Released posthumously by Sony Music Entertainment on 23 October 2006, the album peaked at number 31 on the Finnish Albums Chart.

Track listing

Chart performance

References

2006 compilation albums
Aki Sirkesalo albums
Sony Music compilation albums